Nancy Tellem (born December 13, 1952) is the chief media officer and executive chairwoman of Eko (formerly Interlude (interactive video)), a start-up focused on interactive music videos. She is the onetime entertainment and digital media president of Microsoft and an ex-president of CBS Television Studios, formerly CBS Paramount Television.

Legal/TV Career
Tellem was born to a Jewish family in Danville, California, the daughter of an anesthesiologist mother and surgeon father. Her parents were Jewish survivors of the Holocaust. Tellem got hooked on TV as a child through fan magazines that the networks used to mail out during the summer to promote new shows. As an undergraduate at the University of California Berkeley, she interned one summer for Congressman Ron Dellums (D-Calif.) on Capitol Hill and met her future husband, Arn Tellem. After earning a JD from the University of California Hastings College of the Law, she practiced law for four years in Los Angeles. Among her first jobs was chasing down people who claimed to be heirs to Howard Hughes's estate. Tellem then jumped to entertainment, working initially as the legal expert on famed lawyer F. Lee Bailey's short-lived 1982 show Lie Detector. Eventually she would end up working for Merv Griffin on his Wheel of Fortune show before moving to Lorimar Television, where she was in the legal affairs department.

Warner Bros. and CBS Paramount
When Lorimar merged with Warner Bros. television, Leslie Moonves became head of WB. In 1987, he promoted Tellem to Executive Vice President for Business and Financial Affairs. When Moonves became head of CBS Entertainment in 1995, he appointed Tellem the network's Executive Vice President of Business Affairs, and, later, head of CBS Productions, the unit responsible for producing original series for the network.

In 1998, Moonves became the president of CBS, and named Tellem his successor. That year Tellem ascended to the presidency of CBS Entertainment, where she oversaw programming, development, production, business affairs and network operations. She was responsible for deciding which shows appeared on CBS, supervised the prime-time, daytime, late-night and Saturday morning lineup on both CBS and The CW Television Network - the merged network of The WB and UPN - including shows like CSI, Survivor, Everybody Loves Raymond and The King of Queens, and helped create the landmark shows Friends and ER. In 2010, she stepped down as president, and took on a new role as a senior advisor to Moonves.

Tellem was the second woman in television history, after ABC's Jamie Tarses, to hold the top entertainment post at a major broadcast network. In 2003, she was named the third most powerful woman in entertainment by The Hollywood Reporter. From 2006 through 2008, Forbes magazine ranked Tellem 75th, 49th and 32nd, respectively, on its annual list of the 100 Most Powerful Women. She placed third on Entertainment Weeklys 2008 list of the 25 smartest people in TV for restoring CBS's entire prime-time line-up quickly after the 100-day writers’ strike.

Microsoft
In June, 2012, reports surfaced that Microsoft was looking to hire Tellem to head the software giant's entertainment division, which included Zune and the company's Xbox and Xbox Live products. In September, 2012, Tellem joined the company as entertainment and digital media president, and set about putting together a team to develop series that would be available exclusively through the Xbox platform. She left the company when the studio shut down in October, 2014.

Interlude
In April, 2015, Tellem became executive chairman and chief media officer of Interlude, a technology company and creator of interactive music videos.  Tellem had been an advisor and investor in the company, and had joined its board of directors in 2014.

Awards and honors
In 2006, Tellem was inducted into the Broadcasting & Cable Hall of Fame, in recognition of her contributions to the electronic arts. Two years later she received a National Association of Television Program Executives' Brandon Tartikoff Legacy Award, which recognizes television professionals who exhibit extraordinary passion, leadership, independence and vision in the process of creating TV programming.

Personal
Tellem is married to former sports agent Arn Tellem, the vice chairman of Palace Sports & Entertainment, which owns the Detroit Pistons. The couple has three sons: Michael, Matthew and Eric.

References

External links
The Paley Center for Media: Nancy Tellem, Television Executive, Biography

1953 births
Living people
American television executives
American women in business
American women lawyers
20th-century American Jews
Paramount Global people
CBS executives
Women television executives
Microsoft employees
Presidents of CBS Entertainment
Presidents of CBS, Inc.
University of California, Berkeley alumni
University of California, Hastings College of the Law alumni
The CW executives
21st-century American Jews
20th-century American women
21st-century American women